Omoglymmius peckorum is a species of beetle in the subfamily Rhysodidae. It was described by R.T. Bell and J.R. Bell in 1985. It is known from Viti Levu, Fiji. It is named after the collectors of the type series, S. and J. Peck.

Omoglymmius peckorum measure  in length.

References

peckorum
Beetles of Oceania
Insects of Fiji
Endemic fauna of Fiji
Beetles described in 1985